Don't Talk, Just Listen is the second album by American R&B group B5. It was released on September 10, 2007 in the United Kingdom and on September 11 in the United States. The first single is "Hydrolics" featuring Bow Wow, their second single is "In My Bedroom".

The album debuted at number 27 on the U.S. Billboard 200, selling about 19,000 copies in its first week.

Track listing 
 "Hydrolics" (featuring Bow Wow) (Produced by Soul Diggaz and Written by Andre Merritt, Dee1 and Rickey Deleon) -3:56
 "How You Not Gonna" (Produced by Mario Winans) -4:02
 "Right To Left" (Produced by Bryan Michael Cox) -3:47
 "Erika Kane" (Produced by Bryan Michael Cox) -3:51
 "She Got It Like That" (Produced by Blaze) -4:42
 "Tear Drops" (Produced by Danja) -3:26
 "In My Bedroom"  (Produced by Shea Taylor)  -3:34
 "All Over Again" (Produced by The Underdogs) -4:05
 "What It Do" (Produced by The Underdogs) -3:43
 "No One Else" -3:04
 "I Must Love Drama"  (Produced by Eric Hudson and Written by Andre Merritt )  -4:15
 "So Incredible" (Produced by Blaze) -4:08
 "Things I Would Do" (Produced by The Underdogs) -3:15
 "Rockstar" (Hidden Track) -4:19
 "Boom Boom Boom (Circuit City bonus track) -3:11

Personnel 
Credits for Don't Talk Just Listen adapted from Allmusic.

 Adonis - Audio Production
 Andre 'Hotbox' Brissett - Audio Production
 Chris Athens - Mastering
 B5 - Vocals (Background)
 Chapman Bachler - Photography
 Gary Baker - Composer
 Blaze - Engineer, Various
 Adrian Breeding - Stylist
 Carnell Breeding - Composer
 Kelly Breeding - Composer
 Patrick Breeding - Composer
 Briss - Various
 Andre Brissett - Composer, Producer
 Mike Butler - Engineer
 Tiffany Bynum - Production Assistant
 Candice Childress - Production Coordination
 Sean "Puffy" Combs - Executive Producer
 Bryan-Michael Cox - Audio Production, Bass, Composer, Drums, Guitar (Bass), Keyboards, Producer, Programming
 Fred Crawford - Arranger, Instrumentation, Producer, Vocal Producer
 Nathaniel "Danja" Hills - Audio Production, Composer
 Eric Dawkins - Composer
 Kendrick "Wyldcard" Dean - Composer, Audio Production, Producer, Strings
 Steve "Rock Star" Dickey - Engineer
 Antonio Dixon - Composer
 Corte Ellis - Composer
 Fred 'Blaze' Crawford - Audio Production
 John Frye - Mixing
 Rob Gold - Art Manager, Producer
 Thaddis "Kuk" Harrell - Engineer
 Carlos Hassan - Composer
 Nate Hertweck - Assistant
 John Holmes - Engineer
 Eric Hudson - Audio Production, Composer, Instrumentation, Producer, Various
 Jun Ishizeki - Engineer
 Rob Knox - Audio Production, Composer, Producer, Various
 Mack Woodward - Audio Engineer
 Riley Mackin - Assistant
 Harvey Mason, Jr. - Composer
 Lidia McKinney - Stylist
 Justin "Just One" Miller - Engineer
 Justin Milner - Engineer
 Mischke - Audio Production
 Gwendolyn Niles - A&R
 Michael Patterson - Mixing
 Phantom Boyz - Audio Production
 Harve "Joe Hooker" Pierre - Executive Producer
 Michelle Piza - Packaging Manager
 John Regan - Art Direction, Design
 Aaron Renner - Engineer
 Ruben Rivera - Assistant
 Steve Russell - Composer
 Alexis Seton - Engineer
 Soul Diggaz - Producer, Audio Production
 Adonis Shropshire - Vocal Producer, Vocals
 Shea Taylor - Audio Production
 Damon Thomas - Composer
 Sam Thomas - Mixing
 Sharon Tucker - A&R
 The Underdogs - Audio Production, Mixing, Producer, Various
 Kevin Wales - Audio Production, Composer, Engineer, Executive Producer, Producer
 Roxy Wales - Stylist
 Mario Winans - Audio Production, Composer, Producer
 Mike Winans - Composer
 Wyldcard - Strings

Charts

References 

2007 albums
B5 (group) albums
Bad Boy Records albums
Albums produced by Bryan-Michael Cox
Albums produced by Danja (record producer)
Albums produced by Eric Hudson
Albums produced by the Underdogs (production team)